The men's K-4 1000 metres event was a fours kayaking event conducted as part of the Canoeing at the 1972 Summer Olympics program.

Medalists

Results

Heats
The 20 crews first raced in three heats on September 5. The top three finishers from each of the heats advanced directly to the semifinals while the remaining 11 teams were relegated to the repechage heats.

Repechages
Taking place on September 7, The top three competitors in each of the two repechages advanced to the semifinals.

Semifinals
The top three finishers in each of the three semifinals (raced on September 8) advanced to the final.

The Soviet Union's position at 500 meters in the second semifinal is missing in the official report. The third semifinal was so fast that Belgium and Yugoslavia's time would have gotten them into the finals if either nation had competed in the other two semifinals.

Final
The final was held on September 9.

References
1972 Summer Olympics official report Volume 3. pp. 491–3. 
Sports-reference.com 1972 K-4 1000 m results.

Men's K-4 1000
Men's events at the 1972 Summer Olympics